Forrestina Calf "Frosty" Boss Ribs, (born April 12, 1955), is a Democratic member of the Montana House of Representatives represented the 15th District from 2009 to 2011, until her defeat by 72 votes in the 2010 by Republican Joe Read, after which she again represented the district from 2013 to 2015 after defeating Joe Read, who again ran for reelection, by 523 votes.

Additionally, she served as vice-chair of the Blackfeet Tribal Business Council, the governing body of the Blackfeet Nation. She resides on reservation land in Heart Butte.

References

External links
 Official legislative profile

Living people
Democratic Party members of the Montana House of Representatives
Women state legislators in Montana
Blackfeet Nation people
Native American state legislators in Montana
Native American women in politics
People from Browning, Montana
1955 births
21st-century American women